Mill Run may refer to a geographic feature in the United States:

Streams
 Mill Run (Neshannock Creek tributary), a stream in Mercer County, Pennsylvania
 Mill Run (South Branch Potomac River tributary), a stream in Hampshire County, West Virginia
 Mill Run (Susquehanna River tributary), a stream in Wyoming County, Pennsylvania
 Mill Run (Trent River tributary), a stream in Jones County, North Carolina

Communities
 Mill Run, Blair County, Pennsylvania, a census-designated place
 Mill Run, Fayette County, Pennsylvania, an unincorporated community near the Frank Lloyd Wright "Fallingwater"
 Mill Run, Pocahontas County, West Virginia, a ghost town in Pocahontas County, West Virginia
 Mill Run, Tucker County, West Virginia, a ghost town in Tucker County, West Virginia

See also 
 Mill Run Playhouse (aka Mill Run Theatre), a theater in the round in Niles, Illinois
 Mill Run Wind Energy Center, a wind farm in Fayette County, Pennsylvania
 Run of the Mill, a song by George Harrison